VM Labs was a semiconductor and platform company, founded in 1995 in Los Altos, Silicon Valley, California.

Products
The company's technology and NUON brand was used in DVD players from Toshiba, Samsung and RCA, as well as the Streamaster IP set-top box from Motorola.

The Nuon platform was featured in the specialized media for the 3D video game titles it would bring to DVD players and set-top boxes, as well as for the features that were not available on other DVD players when playing standard DVD-formatted titles. Notable embedded features included Jeff Minter's Virtual Light Machine (VLM) for music, real-time zoom, gamma-correction and smooth reverse shuttle.

Although Nuon DVD technology was initially supported by various Hollywood studios with plans to release several enhanced DVD titles, only four were ultimately released, including Bedazzled and Planet of the Apes.

History
The founder of VM Labs, Richard Miller, was a former vice president of Atari Corporation, and several prominent VM Labs employees (including Jeff Minter and John Mathieson) were also associated with Atari Corporation.

After critical funding collapsed shortly after September 11, 2001, VM Labs was sold to Genesis Microchip after a brief period in Chapter 11.

Genesis Microchip planned to integrate the Nuon and Faroudja technologies for the DVD market, and ultimately used the NUON technology in HDTV chipsets. As an expanded DVD format and video game platform, as of November 2004, there were no Nuon-enabled DVD players shipping and no new Nuon software titles.

Timeline
1995 – Company founded in Los Altos, CA. Seed financing and non-exclusive license agreement with Motorola for media processor design.

1996 – First Nuon Media Processor design delivered to Motorola for layout

1997 – Prototype silicon received. Second silicon (Quad-core "Oz") delivered to customers.

1999 – Production shipments of quad-core "Aries-1" silicon, operating system and firmware to Motorola, Samsung, RCA and others.

2000 – "Aries-2" begins production

2001 – "Aries-3" silicon (first fully designed at VM Labs) begins production. This design was faster, lower cost, lower power and more highly integrated than the Motorola versions, and fabricated at TSMC.

Feb 2002 – Genesis Microchip acquires VM Lab's assets and hires 50 remaining employees

References

External links
 VM Labs homepage (ARCHIVED)

Defunct semiconductor companies of the United States
Technology companies based in the San Francisco Bay Area
Defunct video game companies of the United States
Companies based in Santa Clara County, California
Los Altos, California
Computer companies established in 1995
Video game companies established in 1995
Computer companies disestablished in 2002
Video game companies disestablished in 2002
1995 establishments in California
2002 disestablishments in California
Defunct companies based in the San Francisco Bay Area